Malbina is a rural locality in the local government area (LGA) of Derwent Valley in the South-east LGA region of Tasmania. The 2016 census recorded a population of 67 for the state suburb of Malbina.

History 
Malbina was gazetted as a locality in 1970. 

The locality was originally called Molesworth, but was changed to avoid confusion with other places. Malbina is believed to be an Aboriginal word for “drake”.

Geography
Sorell Creek forms the northern and eastern boundaries.

Road infrastructure 
Route C615 (Molesworth Road) runs through from north to south.

References

Towns in Tasmania
Localities of Derwent Valley Council